Leucopomyia is a genus of flies belonging to the family Chamaemyiidae.

Species:
 Leucopomyia alticeps (Czerny, 1936)

References

Chamaemyiidae